The Drake class was a four-ship class of armoured cruisers built around 1900 for the Royal Navy.

Design and description

The Drake class were enlarged and improved versions of the  designed by Sir William White, Chief Constructor of the Royal Navy, to counter the new French armoured cruiser . They displaced  and proved to be good seaboats in service. Their crew consisted of 900 officers and other ranks.

The ships were powered by two 4-cylinder triple-expansion steam engines, each driving one shaft, using steam provided by 43 Belleville boilers.

The main armament of the Drake-class ships consisted of two breech-loading (BL)  Mk X guns in single gun turrets, one each fore and aft of the superstructure. The ships' secondary armament of sixteen BL 6-inch Mk VII guns was arranged in casemates amidships. Eight of these were mounted on the main deck and were only usable in calm weather. A dozen quick-firing (QF) 12-pounder 12 cwt guns were fitted for defence against torpedo boats. Two additional 12-pounder 8 cwt guns could be dismounted for service ashore. The ships also carried three 3-pounder Hotchkiss guns and two submerged  torpedo tubes.

The armour of the gun turrets and their barbettes was 6 inches thick while the casemate armour was 5 inches thick.

Ships
The following table gives the build details and purchase cost of the members of the Drake class.  Standard British practice at that time was for these costs to exclude armament and stores.  The compilers of The Naval Annual revised costs quoted for British ships between the 1905 and 1906 editions.  The reasons for the differences are unclear.

Service history

The ships served in the First World War with only two surviving it. Good Hope was sunk at the Battle of Coronel in 1914 and Drake was torpedoed in 1917. Drake was also used to ferry Russian bullion (gold) in October 1914 from Arkhangelsk. The gold (equivalent of $39 million) was security for western loans. The transfer took place at high seas, 30 miles off the coast in the dead of night.

Notes

Footnotes

Bibliography 
 Brassey, T.A. (ed) The Naval Annual 1905
 
 

 
 Leyland, J. and Brassey, T.A. (ed.) The Naval Annual 1906

External links

The Dreadnought Project Technical details of the ships.

Cruiser classes
 
Ship classes of the Royal Navy